Stavros Arnaoutakis (born  25 May 1956) is a Greek politician and former Member of the European Parliament (MEP) for the Panhellenic Socialist Movement (PASOK); part of the Party of European Socialists. He has also served as the Deputy Minister for the Economy.

In the November 2010 elections, he was elected as the governor for the Crete Region, supported by PASOK.

References

External links
 

1956 births
Living people
PASOK politicians
PASOK MEPs
MEPs for Greece 2004–2009
Regional governors of Greece
Politicians from Crete
People from Heraklion (regional unit)